The Snug Harbor Music Hall on the grounds of Sailors' Snug Harbor in the New Brighton neighborhood of Staten Island is a 686-seat Greek Revival auditorium that opened in July 1892, making it the second-oldest music hall in New York City.  It was designed by the English immigrant architect Robert W. Gibson. Its inaugural performance was the cantata, "The Rose Maiden." In attendance were around 600 residents in plain wooden seats and 300 trustees with their guests in upholstered balcony seats. Entertainment in the decades that followed included the Georgia Minstrels and the Boston Ladies Schubert Quartet. It added film screenings in 1911 and sound projection in 1930. The building closed sometime in the 1970s when the campus faced a lack of funds and a decline in residents.

Its interior melds ancient Roman architecture with the Greek myth of Orpheus.

Renovations to the interior in 1987 designed by Rafael Viñoly were set to cost up to $20 million but the project was left unfinished due to cost overruns and a poor initial state despite conservation efforts while it was closed. In 1997 Vinoly's firm oversaw a more modest $3 million renovation. In 2019, they broke ground on a new $19.5 million project that would expand and renovate the music hall with a new annex to its east. The project's landscape design was recognized in 2016 with an NYC Public Design Commission Award for Studio Joseph. It was scheduled to open in 2021.

Renovations

1987 Restoration Attempts 
In 1987, Rafael Vinoly Architects won the Snug Harbor Cultural Center's design competition for the renovation of the Snug Harbor Music Hall. Vinoly's plans included carefully expanding the stage and other facilities without compromising its iconic original interior and exterior designs. The plans also included basic restoration of the hall's deteriorating interior. Peeling paint, large holes in the balcony floor, and chunks of fallen plaster were all set to be fixed. However, an already hefty $10 million budget quickly became $20 million and the project was put on hold and eventually canceled. In 1997 Vinoly's firm began overseeing a much more modest renovation project with a budget of $3 million. This plan included only the bare minimum, intending to get the building operable and welcoming guests again for the first time in over 20 years.

2019 Expansion and Renovation 
Designed by Studio Joseph Architects through DDC's Design Excellence Program, the City of New York committed nearly $20 million to bring the Snug Harbor Music Hall into the 21st century, allowing it to accommodate larger-scale modern performances and events. The main scope of the project is its eastern annex. The annex includes a new loading dock, increased backstage space and facilities, two offices, a restroom, ADA compliant dressing rooms, and access between the music hall and the annex. Additionally, the entire building will get an upgrade to its fire alarm and suppression system to meet modern-day fire codes. The renovations brought the entire facility up to Actors Equity standards, allowing it to host Equity showcases and productions now for the first time in its history. The building was also made more ADA accessible than it had ever been before. The entire new annex, main floor, stage, and orchestra pit were all planned with ADA-compliant amenities.

References

Music hall venues
Buildings and structures in Staten Island
1892 establishments in New York (state)